Federated States of Micronesia competed at the 2011 World Aquatics Championships in Shanghai, China between 16 and 31 July 2011.

Swimming

The Federated States of Micronesia qualified 3 swimmers.

Men

Women

References

World Aquatics Championships
2011
Nations at the 2011 World Aquatics Championships